View from Within is an album by Muhal Richard Abrams released on the Italian Black Saint label in 1985 and featuring performances of six of Abrams' compositions by an octet.

Reception

The AllMusic review by Ron Wynn states "This '84 date included some intriguing instrumental configurations at times (vibes/flute/percussion, piano/clarinet/bass clarinet) and ranked among his best '80s dates". The Penguin Guide to Jazz awarded the album 3 stars stating "View sounds like a thoroughly personal statement. The multi-instrumental approach lends it a fluid, unsettled quality, but with a huge timbral and textural range".

Track listing

All compositions by Muhal Richard Abrams
 "Laja" - 6:36  
 "View from Within" - 7:52  
 "Personal Conversations" - 7:45  
 "Down at Peppers" - 12:31  
 "Positrain" - 3:48  
 "Inner Lights" - 4:00

Personnel
Muhal Richard Abrams: piano, gongs
Stanton Davis: trumpet, flugelhorn
John Purcell: soprano saxophone, alto saxophone, tenor saxophone, bass clarinet, flute 
Marty Ehrlich: alto saxophone, flute, piccolo, tenor saxophone, clarinet, bass clarinet
Warren Smith: vibraphone, marimba, gongs
Ray Mantilla: bongos, conga, percussion 
Rick Rozie: bass
Thurman Barker: drums orchestral bells, marimba, gong

References

1985 albums
Muhal Richard Abrams albums
Black Saint/Soul Note albums